The 2001 Queensland Cup season was the 6th season of Queensland's top-level statewide rugby league competition run by the Queensland Rugby League. The competition, known as the Bundy Gold Cup due to sponsorship from Bundaberg Rum, featured 11 teams playing a 26-week long season (including finals) from March to September.

The Toowoomba Clydesdales defeated the Redcliffe Dolphins 28–26 in the grand final at Dolphin Oval to claim their second premiership. Redcliffe  Adam Mogg was named the competition's Player of the Year.

Teams 
The number of teams in the Queensland Cup was reduced from 12 to 11 in 2001 with the withdrawal of inaugural club, the Cairns Cyclones. The Easts Tigers re-branded as the East Coast Tigers.

For the 2001 season, the Brisbane Broncos and Melbourne Storm were again affiliated with the Toowoomba Clydesdales and Norths Devils, respectively. After partnering for the 2000 season, the Auckland Warriors ended their affiliation with the Souths Magpies.

Ladder

Finals series

Grand final 

Toowoomba dominated the regular season, finishing first (winning their second minor premiership) and only losing one game. After earning a bye in the first week of the finals, they lost their second game of the season to Redcliffe in the major semi-final. This forced them into the preliminary final, where they defeated Burleigh to set up a Grand final rematch with the Dolphins, their third meeting in a grand final. Redcliffe finished the regular season in third and qualified for their third straight grand final after defeating the Clydesdales in Week 2.

First half 
Redcliffe got off to the best start possible when centre Jason Webber scored inside the first minute after a Toowoomba error. Seven minutes later, Craig O'Dwyer latched onto an Adam Mogg grubber to give the Dolphins their second try. Toowoomba hit back not long after when hooker Michael Ryan scored from dummy half. The scores were then levelled when Tony Duggan dived on a loose ball in the in-goal and Damien Quinn converted from the sideline. The Clydesdales took their first lead of the match in the 35th minute when prop Kirk Reynoldson scored. The lead was short lived, as Redcliffe tied the game two minutes before the break when winger George Wilson crossed out wide.

Second half 
The Dolphins came out firing after half time, scoring inside three minutes when bench forward Andrew Wynyard broke through for a try. The scoreline remained unchanged for the next 20 minutes until a Ken McGuinness cutout pass saw Quinn score in the corner. Quinn then converted his own try from the sideline to lock the score at 22-all. Redcliffe clawed ahead once again when Luke Scott scored inside the final 10 minutes, setting up a tense finish. With 30 seconds left on the clock and Toowoomba pressuring Redcliffe's try line, halfback Casey McGuire scored next to the posts to level the scores at 26-all. Quinn then stepped up to kick the simple conversion and give Toowoomba their second premiership victory. Clydesdales' fullback Ken McGuinness was named man of the match.

Five years later, Toowoomba pair Brent Tate and Casey McGuire won an NRL premiership with the Brisbane Broncos, when they defeated the Melbourne Storm in the 2006 grand final. Their Clydesdales teammate Nathan Friend was on the losing Storm side.

Player statistics

Leading try scorers

Leading point scorers

End-of-season awards 
 Courier Mail Medal: Adam Mogg ( Redcliffe Dolphins)
 Rookie of the Year: Martin Allen ( Easts Tigers)

See also 

 Queensland Cup
 Queensland Rugby League

References 

2001 in Australian rugby league
Queensland Cup